Bribri may refer to:
 Bribri people
 Bribri language
 Bribri, Costa Rica, a city